Salesbury is a civil parish in Ribble Valley, Lancashire, England.  It contains four listed buildings that are recorded in the National Heritage List for England.  All of the listed buildings are designated at Grade II, the lowest of the three grades, which is applied to "buildings of national importance and special interest".  The parish contains the village of Salesbury and the residential area of Copster Green, and is otherwise rural.  The listed buildings consist of a farmhouse with an attached stable, and two houses, one with a sundial base in the grounds.

Buildings

References

Citations

Sources

Lists of listed buildings in Lancashire
Buildings and structures in Ribble Valley